Baltimore Career Academy is a public high school located in Baltimore, Maryland, United States that offers both academic and skills training in an alternative learning environment.  The program integrates academic classes with occupational specific training for youth, ages 16–21. The school also offers credit recovery and GED courses for those students who have completed high school credits in other schools.

Notes

External links
 page at Baltimore City Schools
 School site
 

Public schools in Baltimore
Public high schools in Maryland
Alternative schools in the United States